Spain competed at the 1920 Summer Olympics in Antwerp, Belgium.  It was only the second appearance of the nation at the Summer Games, after competing in the 1900 Summer Olympics, but missing the Games in 1904, 1908, and 1912. 58 competitors, all men, took part in 29 events in 7 sports.

Medalists

Aquatics

Swimming

Two swimmers, both men, represented Spain in 1920. It was the nation's debut in the sport. Neither man advanced past the quarterfinals.

Ranks given are within the heat.

 Men

Water polo

Spain competed in the Olympic water polo tournament for the first time in 1920. The Bergvall System was in use at the time. Spain took advantage of an Italian forfeit in the round of 16 to advance to the quarterfinals, but there met the dominant Great Britain—the British team was on its way to its fourth gold medal in four appearances. Losing to the gold medalist, however, had its advantages under the Bergvall System. Spain got a chance to contest the silver medal. It lost in the silver medal semifinals to the United States, however, and the Americans' loss to Belgium kept Spain from trying for the bronze.

 Round of 16

 Italy forfeited the match.

 Quarterfinals

 Silver medal semifinals

 Final rank 7th

Athletics

14 athletes represented Spain in 1920. It was the nation's debut in athletics. Domínguez's 25th-place finish in the cross country was the only time a Spanish athlete competed in, and finished, an event final.

Ranks given are within the heat.

Football

Spain competed in the Olympic football tournament for the first time. The team compiled a record of 4–1 on the way to a silver medal; the four wins were the most of any team in 1920. A first-round win over Denmark set up a quarterfinal contest against eventual gold-medalists Belgium—Spain's only loss. In the consolation tournament, the Spanish squad won its matches against Sweden and Italy to advance to the silver medal game against the Netherlands, which Spain won.

 First round

 Quarterfinals

 Consolation first round

 Consolation semifinals

 Consolation final

Final rank  Silver

Polo

Spain competed in the Olympic polo tournament for the first time. The team took the silver medal, beating the United States in the semifinals but losing to Great Britain in the final.

 Semifinals

 Final

 Final rank  Silver

Shooting

Seven shooters represented Spain in 1920. It was the nation's debut in the sport. Spain's best result was sixth place, achieved in the team military pistol event.

Tennis

Four tennis players, all men, competed for Spain in 1920. It was the nation's debut in the sport. Manuel Alonso had the most success in the singles, winning three matches to advance to the quarterfinals before being beaten. Fernández de Liencres and de Satrústegui were the better of the two doubles pairs, advancing to the second round.

References

External links
 
 Spanish Olympic Committee
 International Olympic Committee results database
 

Nations at the 1920 Summer Olympics
1920
Olympics